The term harka in Maghrebi history refers to a military campaign with military, political, or financial (tax-collecting) goals, often a punitive expedition against insurgents. 

Historically, the term refers to military campaigns carried out by the sultans of Morocco or other high-ranking officials, such as qaids, with the goal of collecting taxes or pacifying or suppressing revolting regions or tribes (as in Bled es-Siba).

Walter Burton Harris described a harka in the time of Sultan Abdelaziz in Morocco That Was, although he confused it with the word harqa related to burning.

See also

References 
Military terminology
History of Morocco
All stub articles